The Walshes is an Irish comedy television series that was first broadcast on RTÉ One on 6 March and BBC Four on 13 March 2014. The three-part series was written by Graham Linehan and the comedy group Diet of Worms, and is based on the group's 2010 web series The Taste of Home. The show follows the Walshes, a tight-knit family living in the fictional West Dublin suburb of Strollinstown. Diet of Worms portray the family, reprising their roles from the web series.

The show was originally shown on BBC Four and was broadcast again on BBC Two in November 2014. The writer, Graham Linehan, has said that if the show gets higher viewing figures this time it may come back with a new series. In January 2015, Graham Linehan announced on Twitter that the show had been cancelled, blaming "zero publicity" from BBC Two.

Cast
Niall Gaffney as Tony
Philippa Dunne as Carmel
Amy Stephenson as Ciara, daughter of Tony and Carmel
Rory Connolly as Rory, son of Tony and Carmel
Shane Langan as Graham, Ciara's new boyfriend
Owen Roe as Martin, a family friend

Production
The show is based on The Taste of Home, a five-episode web series released in 2010, starring and written by the comedy group Diet of Worms. In November 2013, it was reported that Linehan had directed a pilot based on the web series, marking his first non-audience sitcom. The show is co-produced by Boom Pictures and Delightful Industries for RTÉ and the BBC, but was originally intended for ITV. Richard Boden serves as producer. Studio filming took place at Teddington Studios in London, while some location filming took place in Dublin.

Episode list

References

External links
 
 
 
 

2010s British sitcoms
2014 British television series debuts
2014 British television series endings
2014 Irish television series debuts
2014 Irish television series endings
BBC television sitcoms
Television series created by Graham Linehan
Dublin (city) in fiction
English-language television shows
Irish comedy television shows
RTÉ original programming
Television series based on Internet-based works
Television shows set in the Republic of Ireland
Television shows shot at Teddington Studios